"Yesterday's Songs" is a 1981 single by Neil Diamond from his album On the Way to the Sky. The song was a major adult contemporary radio hit, spending six weeks at #1 on the U.S. Billboard chart and four weeks atop the Canadian Adult Contemporary chart.  On the Billboard Hot 100, it peaked at #11.  On the Canadian pop charts, the song reached #15. "Yesterday's Songs" is ranked as the 77th biggest American hit of 1982.

Record World said that "If the intriguing keyboard melody or snappy beat doesn't grab you, Diamond's spirited vocal romanticism will."

Chart history

Weekly charts

Year-end charts

See also
Neil Diamond discography
List of number-one adult contemporary singles of 1981 (U.S.)

References

External links
 

Neil Diamond songs
1981 singles
Songs written by Neil Diamond
Columbia Records singles
1981 songs
Songs about nostalgia
Songs about music